Sealab 2020 is an American animated television series produced by Hanna-Barbera Productions and broadcast on NBC from September 9 to December 2, 1972, on Saturday mornings. The series was created by Alex Toth, who also created such other Hanna-Barbera cartoons as Space Ghost and Birdman and the Galaxy Trio. A total of 13 episodes were aired, with two episodes remaining unaired. As with most Hanna-Barbera series, the show was in occasional rotation on Boomerang, the TV channel that owns the Hanna-Barbera archives. From 2000 to 2005, the series had returned for a second life when it was parodied as Sealab 2021 on Cartoon Network's Adult Swim.

Plot
The series took place at Sealab, an underwater research base on the Challenger seamount. Commanded by Captain Michael Murphy, Sealab was home to 250 people, and was dedicated to the exploration of the seas and the protection of marine life. Dr. Paul Williams, a Chinook oceanographer, led the scientific research team.

Among other things, the crew of Sealab faced such challenges as attacks from sharks and giant squids, potential environmental disasters, and threats to Sealab and marine life from shipping.

Cast
 Ross Martin as Paul Williams
 John Stephenson as Captain Michael "Mike" Murphy, Quincy Jones
 Josh Albee as Robert Murphy
 Pamelyn Ferdin as Sally Murphy
 William Callaway as Lieutenant Sparks
 Jerry Dexter as Hal Bryant
 Ann Jillian as Gail Adams
 Ron Pinkard as Ed Thomas, Mrs. Thomas's son
 Olga James as Mrs. Thomas, Ed Thomas's mother
 Gary Shapiro as Jamie
 Mike Road as Matthew Mills
 Casey Kasem as Craig Bracken
 Don Messick as Lawrence Cummings

Episodes

Parody
Sealab 2020 was parodied by the Cartoon Network Adult Swim show Sealab 2021 from 2000 to 2005.

Home media
On May 22, 2012, Warner Archive released Sealab 2020: The Complete Series on DVD in region 1 as part of their Hanna-Barbera Classics Collection. Although promoted as 'The Complete Series', the DVD consists only of the thirteen aired episodes and does not include Episodes 14 and 15 that were unaired. This is a manufacture-on-demand (MOD) release, available exclusively through Warner's online store and Amazon.com.

The pilot episode "Deep Threat" is included in the Warner Bros. Saturday Morning Cartoons: 1970s Vol. 2 DVD set.

Print media
The fanzine Lancelot Link Fan World, published by Cornell Kimball, often covered Sealab 2020.

References

External links
 
 Sealab 2020 at Don Markstein's Toonopedia. Archived from the original on May 19, 2017.

1972 American television series debuts
1972 American television series endings
1970s American animated television series
1970s American science fiction television series
American children's animated adventure television series
American children's animated science fiction television series
English-language television shows
NBC original programming
Television series set in 2020
Television series set in the future
Television series by Hanna-Barbera
Nautical television series
Underwater civilizations in fiction